Roger Angell (September 19, 1920 – May 20, 2022) was an American essayist known for his writing on sports, especially baseball. The only writer ever elected into both the American Academy of Arts and Letters and the Baseball Writers' Association of America, he was a regular contributor to The New Yorker and was its chief fiction editor for many years. He wrote numerous works of fiction, non-fiction, and criticism, and for many years wrote an annual Christmas poem for The New Yorker.

Early life and education
Born on September 19, 1920, in Manhattan, New York, Angell was the son of Katharine Sergeant Angell White, The New Yorkers first fiction editor, and the stepson of renowned essayist E. B. White, but he was raised for the most part by his father, Ernest Angell, an attorney who became head of the American Civil Liberties Union.

After graduating in 1938 from the Pomfret School, he attended Harvard University. He served in the United States Army Air Forces during World War II.

Career
In 1948, Angell was employed at Holiday Magazine, a travel magazine that featured literary writers. His earliest published works were pieces of short fiction and personal narratives, several of which were collected in The Stone Arbor and Other Stories (1960) and A Day in the Life of Roger Angell (1970).

Angell first contributed to The New Yorker while serving in Hawaii as editor of an Air Force magazine; his short story titled "Three Ladies in the Morning" was published in March 1944. He became The New Yorkers fiction editor in the 1950s, occupying the same office as his mother, and continued to write for the magazine until 2020.  "Longevity was actually quite low on his list of accomplishments", wrote his colleague, David Remnick. "He did as much to distinguish The New Yorker as anyone in the magazine's nearly century-long history. His prose and his editorial judgment left an imprint that's hard to overstate."

He first wrote professionally about baseball in 1962, when William Shawn, editor of The New Yorker, had him travel to Florida to write about spring training.  His first two baseball collections were The Summer Game (1972) and Five Seasons: A Baseball Companion (1977).

Angell has been called the "Poet Laureate of baseball" but he disliked the term. In a review of Once More Around the Park for the Journal of Sport History, Richard C. Crepeau wrote that "Gone for Good", Angell's essay on the career of Steve Blass, "may be the best piece that anyone has ever written on baseball or any other sport". Another essay of Angell's, "The Web of the Game", about the epic pitchers' duel between future major-league All-Stars (and eventual teammates) Ron Darling and Frank Viola in the 1981 NCAA baseball tournament, was called "perhaps the greatest baseball essay ever penned" by ESPN journalist Ryan McGee in 2021. Angell contributed commentary to the Ken Burns series Baseball, in 1994.

Personal life and death
Angell was married three times. He had two daughters, Callie and Alice, with his first wife, Evelyn, and a son, John Henry, with his second wife, Carol Rogge Angell. After 48 years of marriage, Carol Angell died on April 10, 2012, at the age of 73 of metastatic breast cancer. In 2014, he married Margaret (Peggy) Moorman. His daughter Callie, an authority on the films of Andy Warhol, died by suicide on May 5, 2010, in Manhattan, where she worked as a curator at the Whitney Museum of American Art; she was 62. In a 2014 essay, he mentioned her death – "the oceanic force and mystery of that event" – and his struggle to comprehend that "a beautiful daughter of mine, my oldest child, had ended her life".

Angell died of congestive heart failure at his home in Manhattan on May 20, 2022, at the age of 101.

Awards 
Angell received a number of awards for his writing, including the George Polk Award for Commentary in 1980, the Kenyon Review Award for Literary Achievement in 2005 along with Umberto Eco, and the inaugural PEN/ESPN Lifetime Achievement Award for Literary Sports Writing in 2011. He was a long-time ex-officio member of the council of the Authors Guild, and was elected a Fellow of the American Academy of Arts and Sciences in 2007. His article This Old Man in The New Yorker on his "challenges and joys of being 93" garnered the National Magazine Award for Essays and Criticism in 2015.
 
He was inducted into the Baseball Reliquary's Shrine of the Eternals in 2010, and he was the 2014 recipient of the J. G. Taylor Spink Award, now known as the BBWAA Career Excellence Award, of the Baseball Writers' Association of America; despite being a New Yorker writer, he was nominated by the San Francisco–Oakland chapter. In 2015 he was inducted into the American Academy of Arts and Letters, a unique combination with the Baseball Hall of Fame.

Bibliography

In 2019, University of Nebraska Press published No Place I Would Rather Be: Roger Angell and a Life in Baseball Writing, a book about Angell's career, written by Joe Bonomo.

Notes

References

External links
 
 

1920 births
2022 deaths
20th-century American essayists
20th-century American male writers
20th-century American poets
20th-century American short story writers
21st-century American essayists
21st-century American male writers
21st-century American poets
American centenarians
American male essayists
American male short story writers
American magazine editors
Baseball writers
BBWAA Career Excellence Award recipients
Deaths from congestive heart failure
Fellows of the American Academy of Arts and Sciences
Harvard College alumni
Men centenarians
Military personnel from New York City
The New Yorker people
Pomfret School alumni
Sportswriters from New York (state)
United States Army Air Forces personnel of World War II
Writers from Manhattan
Members of the American Academy of Arts and Letters